Majestic or The Majestic may refer to:

Arts and entertainment

Film
 The Majestic (film), a 2001 film starring Jim Carrey
 Majestic (film), a 2002 Indian film
 The main antagonist of 50 Cent's 2005 film Get Rich or Die Tryin'

Music

Bands
 Majestic (band), a former power metal band
 Majestic (producer), English DJ and record producer

Albums
 Majestic (Gamma Ray album), 2005
 Majestic, 2010, by ReinXeed
 Majestic (Kari Jobe album), 2014
 Majestic: Revisited, a 2015 Kari Jobe album

Songs
 "The Majestic", from the 1961 Runaround Sue album by Dion
 "Majestic", from the 1981 Captured album by Journey
 "Majestic", a 2008 single by Wax Fang

Other uses in arts and entertainment
 Majestic (video game), a 2001 alternate reality video game
 Mr. Majestic, a WildStorm Comics superhero

Buildings
 Majestic Building (disambiguation)
 Majestic Cinema (disambiguation)
 Majestic Hotel (disambiguation), a list of hotels, including those named Hotel Majestic
 Majestic Theatre (disambiguation)

Businesses
 Majestic Athletic, a sportswear company
 Majestic Film Company, also known as Majestic Motion Pictures, a film studio established in 1911 in California
 Majestic Hotel Group, a Catalan hotel group based in Barcelona
 Majestic International Cruises, a cruise line based in Greece
 The Majestic Line, a cruise line based in Scotland
 Majestic Percussion, a Dutch manufacturer of percussion musical instruments
 Majestic Pictures, an American film production and distribution company active during the 1930s
 Majestic Realty Co., a commercial real estate developer based in Los Angeles
 Majestic Radio, an American radio brand from 1927 to 1955, produced by the Majestic Radio & Television Corporation up to 1949
 Majestic Record Corporation, an American record label in 1916 and 1917
 Majestic Records, a mid-20th century record label
 Majestic Wine, a chain of stores selling alcoholic beverages in the United Kingdom
 Café Majestic, Porto, Portugal

Places
 Majestic, Kentucky, United States, an unincorporated community
 Mount Majestic (Victoria), Australia
 Mount Majestic (Utah), United States

Military
 , five Royal Navy ships
 Majestic-class battleship, a Royal Navy class of pre-dreadnoughts built in the mid-1890s
 Operation Majestic, a plan for the invasion of Japan during World War II

Sports
 Majestic FC, a football club in Burkina Faso
 Seattle Majestics, an American women's football team, formerly the Tacoma Majestics

Transportation
 Majestic (ship), various ships
 Majestic (riverboat), a riverboat/theatre in Cincinnati, Ohio on the National Register of Historic Places
 Daimler Majestic, a luxury car produced from 1958 to 1962
 Majestic, one of the GWR 3031 Class locomotives built for the British Great Western Railway, 1891–1915
 Majestic, a  balloon owned by British aviation pioneer Patrick Young Alexander in 1893
 Majestic metro station, Bangalore, India
 Majestic Bus Station, the old name for Kempegowda Bus Station in Bangalore, India
 The Majestic Line, a cruise line based in Scotland

See also
 Majestic 12, or Majic 12, supposedly a secret committee formed in 1947 to investigate UFO activity, origin of The Majestic Documents
 Starship Majestic, a cruise ship of Premier Cruise Lines 1988–1994, launched as Spirit of London in 1972